Trichothelium is a genus of lichen-forming fungi in the family Trichotheliaceae. It has an estimated 40 species. The genus was circumscribed by Swiss lichenologist Johannes Müller Argoviensis in 1885.

Species
Trichothelium africanum 
Trichothelium akeassii 
Trichothelium alboatrum 
Trichothelium album 
Trichothelium amazonense 
Trichothelium americanum 
Trichothelium angustisporum 
Trichothelium argenteum 
Trichothelium assurgens 
Trichothelium caudatum 
Trichothelium chlorinum 
Trichothelium confusum 
Trichothelium intermedium 
Trichothelium javanicum 
Trichothelium kalbii 
Trichothelium longisetum 
Trichothelium meridionale 
Trichothelium mirum 
Trichothelium montanum 
Trichothelium oceanicum 
Trichothelium pallescens 
Trichothelium pallidum 
Trichothelium pauciseptatum 
Trichothelium philippinum 
Trichothelium poeltii 
Trichothelium porinoides 
Trichothelium robinsonii 
Trichothelium rubellum 
Trichothelium rubescens 
Trichothelium sipmanii 
Trichothelium subargenteum 
Trichothelium wirthii

References

Gyalectales
Gyalectales genera
Lichen genera
Taxa named by Johannes Müller Argoviensis
Taxa described in 1885